Queensburgh is a town in KwaZulu-Natal, South Africa that is situated inland (southwest) from Durban and now forms part of eThekwini, the Greater Durban metropolitan area.

History 
The hilly area was settled by people working in Durban who wanted to escape the humidity of the coastal city. In 1924, four residential townships in the area, Malvern, Escombe, Northdene and Moseley combined to form the town of Malvern. In 1952, to celebrate Queen Elizabeth II's accession to the throne, Malvern received municipality status and changed its name to Queensburgh.

Geography 

Queensburgh is located on the undulating hills between the uMbilo River to the north and the uMhlatuzana River to the south with the exception of its suburb of Shallcross which lies south of the uMhlatuzana River.

Queensburgh is situated approximately 9 km south-west of Durban and is bordered by Pinetown to the west and north-west, Westville to the north-east and the city of Durban to the east and Chatsworth to the south.

Queensburgh is unique in the sense that it is not a typical town that has developed to include suburbs but rather it is a collection of various smaller suburbs mainly consisting of Northdene, Malvern and Escombe. These suburbs along with Queensmead Industrial, the main industrial area of Queensburgh lie north of the uMhlatuzana River. Shallcross, Shallcross Extension 2, Buffels Bosch and Burlington Greenfields lie south of the uMhlatuzana River bordering Chatsworth.

Transport

Rail network 

The main railway line that passes through Queensburgh is the Old Main Line operated by Metrorail KwaZulu-Natal commuter rail system which connects Queensburgh to Pinetown in the north-west and Durban in the north-east. Queensburgh has four railway stations along this railway line including Northdene, Escombe, Malvern and Poet’s Corner.  

The other railway line passing through Queensburgh, New Main Line passes through the south of the town, also operated by Metrorail KwaZulu-Natal. This railway line connects Queensburgh to Durban in the north-east and Mariannhill and Cato Ridge in the north-west and has three railway stations within Queensburgh including Shallcross, Burlington and Cavendish.

Road network 
Queensburgh has access to multiple freeways in the eThekwini Metro including the N2, N3 and M7.

The N2 Outer Ring Road is a national highway that bypasses Queensburgh to the east and links the town to the King Shaka International Airport and KwaDukuza in the north-east and Amanzimtoti and Port Shepstone in the south-west. Access to the N2 from Queensburgh can be obtained through the M7 Solomon Mahlangu Drive interchange (Exit 161).

The N3 Mariannhill Toll Route is a national highway that bypasses Queensburgh to the north and links the town to Pietermaritzburg in the north-west and Durban in the north-east. Access to the N3 from Queensburgh can be obtained through the N3/M7 interchange (Exit 20) in Pinetown.

The M7 Solomon Mahlangu Drive (previously Edwin Swales VC Drive) is a metropolitan freeway that traverses rolling hills of Queensburgh, bypassing most of the suburban area to the north. The freeway links Queensburgh to Pinetown in the north-west and the Bluff, Durban in the east. Access to the M7 from Queensburgh can be obtained through the Bellville Road interchange (Exit 7) and the Main Road interchange (Exit 12).

Other than the M7, Queensburgh is connected by two other metropolitan routes within eThekwini including the M5 (Main Road; to Pinetown and Durban) which is the main artery through Queensburgh’s suburbs and the M10 (Stella Road; to Durban).

Demographics

Queensburgh has a diverse population. The suburb has a significant Indian population who moved to the area from neighbouring townships after apartheid had ended.

English is the dominant language followed by Zulu, Afrikaans and Xhosa.

References

Suburbs of Durban